Greatest Hits Live is a live album by English band Strawbs.

Track listing

"Cut Like a Diamond" (Dave Cousins, Chas Cronk)
"Something for Nothing" (Cousins, Cronk)
"The Hangman and the Papist" (Cousins)
"Ringing Down the Years" (Cousins)
"Stormy Down" (Cousins)
"Afraid to Let You Go" (Rod Demick, Richard Hudson, Brian Willoughby)
"Grace Darling" (Cousins)
"The River/Down by the Sea" (Cousins)
"Lay Down" (Cousins)
"Part of the Union" (Hudson, John Ford)
"Hero and Heroine" (Cousins)

Personnel

Dave Cousins – vocals, acoustic guitar
Tony Hooper – vocals, acoustic guitar
Richard Hudson – drums, vocals
Brian Willoughby – electric guitar
Chris Parren – keyboards
Rod Demick – bass guitar, vocals

Recording

Recorded in 1990 for Central TV's Bedrock series.

Release history

References
Greatest Hits on Strawbsweb

1993 live albums
Strawbs live albums